Klaus Peter Brähmig (born 1 August 1957 in Königstein, Bezirk Dresden) is a German politician and member of the CDU. He represented Sächsische Schweiz-Osterzgebirge in the Bundestag from 2002 until 2017, when he lost reelection to AfD candidate Frauke Petry, who is now an independent.

External links 
 Official website 
 Biography by German Bundestag

References

1957 births
Living people
People from Königstein, Saxony
People from Bezirk Dresden
German Lutherans
Members of the Bundestag for Saxony
Members of the Bundestag 2013–2017
Members of the Bundestag 2009–2013
Members of the Bundestag 2005–2009
Members of the Bundestag 2002–2005
Members of the Bundestag 1998–2002
Members of the Bundestag 1994–1998
Members of the Bundestag 1990–1994
Members of the Bundestag for the Christian Democratic Union of Germany